The Jensen PW is a saloon car built by Jensen Motors from 1946 through 1952. The PW stood for Post-War, as the car was the first model built by Jensen after the Second World War. A convertible model was also built alongside the hardtop saloon.

The first models utilized the Meadows  straight-eight engines. However, issues arising from harsh vibrations while driving eventually led to Jensen engineers to switch first to Nash straight-eights and then to better established  straight-six engines from the Austin Sheerline.

In total, there were less than 20 examples of the PW to leave Jensen's West Bromwich factory.

See also
Jensen Motors
List of British cars

References

PW
Luxury_vehicles
Limousines

Cars introduced in 1946